Ailuropodinae is a subfamily of Ursidae that contains only one extant species, the giant panda (Ailuropoda melanoleuca) of China. The fossil record of this group has shown that various species of pandas were more widespread across the Holarctic, with species found in places such as Europe, much of Asia and even North America.  The earliest pandas were not unlike other modern bear species in that they had an omnivorous diet but by around 2.4 million years ago, pandas have evolved to be more herbivorous.

Systematics
Ever since the giant panda was first described to science, they have been a source of taxonomic confusion, having been variously classified as a member of Procyonidae, Ursidae, Ailuridae, or even their own family Ailuropodidae.  Part of their similarities with the red panda is in particular the presence of a "thumb" and five fingers; the "thumb" – actually a modified sesamoid bone – that helps it to hold bamboo while eating.

Recent genetic studies have shown that ailuropodines are indeed members of the bear family as they are not closely related to red pandas, which are placed in their own family Ailuridae. Any similarities between ailuropodines and ailurids are likely due to convergent evolution as the fossil record has shown the "false thumb" has been required independently for different purposes. The "false thumb" has actually been found in spectacled bears as well, suggesting that it is a plesiomorphic trait among bears that became lost in the Ursinae subfamily.

Taxonomy
The ailuropodines are divided into two tribes the extinct Indarctini and Ailuropodini; the following taxonomy below is after Abella et al. (2012):

 Subfamily Ailuropodinae Grevé, 1894
 Tribe †Indarctini Abella et al., 2012
 †Miomaci de Bonis et al., 2017
 †Miomaci pannonicum de Bonis et al., 2017
 †Indarctos Pilgrim, 1913
 †Indarctos punjabensis (Lydekker, 1884)
 †Indarctos zdanskyi Qiu & Tedford, 2003
 †Indarctos sinensis (Zdansky, 1924)
 †Indarctos vireti Villalta & Crusafont, 1943
 †Indarctos arctoides (Deperet, 1895)
 †Indarctos anthracitis (Weithofer, 1888)
 †Indarctos salmontanus Pilgrim, 1913
 †Indarctos atticus (Weithofer, 1888)
 †Indarctos bakalovi (Kovachev, 1988)
 †Indarctos lagrelli (Zdansky, 1924
 †Indarctos oregonensis Merriam et al., 1916
 †Indarctos nevadensis Macdonald, 1959
 Tribe Ailuropodini Grevé, 1894
 †Kretzoiarctos Abella et al., 2012
 †Kretzoiarctos beatrix Abella et al., 2011
 †Agriarctos Kretzoi, 1942
 †Agriarctos depereti (Schlosser, 1902)
 †Agriarctos gaali Kretzoi, 1942
 †Agriarctos nikolovi Jiangzuo & Spassov, 2022
 †Agriarctos vighi Kretzoi, 1942
 †Ailurarctos Qi et al., 1989
 †Ailurarctos yuanmouensis Zong, 1997
 †Ailurarctos lufengensis Qi et al., 1989
 Ailuropoda Milne-Edwards, 1870
 †Ailuropoda microta Pei, 1962
 †Ailuropoda wulingshanensis Wang & Alii, 1982
 †Ailuropoda baconi Woodward 1915
 Ailuropoda melanoleuca David, 1869 – giant panda

References

Bears
Extant Miocene first appearances